The Eugene Catalan Prize (Prix Eugène-Catalan) is awarded every five years by the Royal Academies for Science and the Arts of Belgium to recognize a scholar who has made important progress in pure mathematics. The prize, created in honor of the mathematician Eugène Charles Catalan, was first given in 1969; the original criteria specified Belgian or French scholars but European Union citizens are now eligible.

Recipients 
The recipients of the Eugene Catalan Prize are:
 2020:  Antoine Gloria
 2015:  Pierre Bieliavsky
 2010:  Pierre-Emmanuel Caprace
 2005:  Didier Smets
 2000:  Jean-Michel Coron
 1995:  Jean-Pierre Tignol
 1990:  Haïm Brezis
 1979:  Roger Apéry
 1974:  J. Goffar-Lombet
 1969:  Gilbert Crombez

See also

 List of mathematics awards

References 

Mathematics awards